Mary Angeline Yson Halili is a Filipino politician who last served as mayor of Tanauan from 2019 to 2022. She is the daughter of former mayor Antonio Halili, who was assassinated on July 2, 2018. She vied for a seat in Congress for Batangas's 3rd district in 2022, but lost to incumbent Ma. Theresa Collantes.

References

Filipino women
21st-century Filipino politicians
Living people
Year of birth missing (living people)
Date of birth missing (living people)
Place of birth missing (living people)